Peter Huntington (born 1973) is a British drummer for Rachel Fuller, and occasional drummer for her partner, Pete Townshend. Due to Zak Starkey's touring commitments with the band, Oasis, Huntington was the main drummer for The Who's first album in 24 years, Endless Wire. Huntington also completed the drumming on the expanded 2011 Quadrophenia box set. He has also played for Darren Hayes, formerly of Savage Garden.

References

Living people
British male drummers
People educated at the Royal Grammar School, Newcastle upon Tyne
1973 births
21st-century drummers
21st-century British male musicians